Lateristachys is a genus of lycophytes in the family Lycopodiaceae. In the Pteridophyte Phylogeny Group classification of 2016 (PPG I), it is placed in the subfamily Lycopodielloideae. Some sources do not recognize the genus, sinking it into Lycopodiella. Lateristachys species are native to the Philippines, Australia and New Zealand.

Species
, the Checklist of Ferns and Lycophytes of the World recognized three species:
Lateristachys diffusa (R.Br.) Holub
Lateristachys halconensis (Copel.) Holub
Lateristachys lateralis (R.Br.) Holub

References

Lycopodiaceae
Lycophyte genera